Brad M. Sullivan is a United States Air Force major general who most recently served as the chief of staff for the United Nations Command and United States Forces Korea. He previously served as commander of the Curtis E. LeMay Center for Doctrine Development and Education and vice commander of the Air University.

References

Living people
Place of birth missing (living people)
Recipients of the Air Force Distinguished Service Medal
Recipients of the Defense Superior Service Medal
Recipients of the Distinguished Flying Cross (United States)
Recipients of the Legion of Merit
United States Air Force generals
United States Air Force personnel of the Iraq War
United States Air Force personnel of the War in Afghanistan (2001–2021)
Year of birth missing (living people)